for Stockwood in Bristol, see Stockwood

Stockwood is a village in west Dorset, England, around eight miles south-west of Sherborne and less than a mile away from Chetnole railway station on the Heart of Wessex Line. There are a few houses on the road leading to the A37 between Yeovil and Dorchester.

St Edwold's Church, often described as Dorset's smallest church, is located in Stockwood.

References

External links

Villages in Dorset